Royal may refer to:

People
 Royal (name), a list of people with either the surname or given name
 A member of a royal family

Places

United States
 Royal, Arkansas, an unincorporated community
 Royal, Illinois, a village
 Royal, Iowa, a city
 Royal, Missouri, an unincorporated community
 Royal, Nebraska, a village
 Royal, Franklin County, North Carolina, an unincorporated area
 Royal, Utah, a ghost town
 Royal, West Virginia, an unincorporated community
 Royal Gorge, on the Arkansas River in Colorado
 Royal Township (disambiguation)

Elsewhere
 Mount Royal, a hill in Montreal, Canada
 Royal Canal, Dublin, Ireland
 Royal National Park, New South Wales, Australia

Arts, entertainment, and media
 Royal (Jesse Royal album), a 2021 reggae album
 The Royal, a British medical drama television series
 The Royal Magazine, a monthly British literary magazine published between 1898 and 1939
 Royal (Indian magazine), a men's lifestyle bimonthly
 Royal Tenenbaum, protagonist of the 2001 film The Royal Tenenbaums, played by Gene Hackman
 "Royal", a song by Deftones from their 2010 album Diamond Eyes

Brands and enterprises
 Royal (restaurant), former Michelin starred restaurant in The Hague, Netherlands
 Royal Tru, a soda brand owned by the Coca-Cola Company
 Chrysler Royal, an automobile produced between 1937 and 1942 and 1946 to 1950
 Dodge Royal, a style of the 1955 Dodge automobile
 Royal Baking Powder Company
 Royal Cinema, Toronto, Canada
 Royal.io, a US-based music rights platform
 Royal Opera House, London, UK, better known as Covent Garden
 Royal Typewriter Company, a leading typewriter company

Military
 No. 32 Squadron RAF, or the Royal Squadron
 Régiment Royal, a French Army regiment established in 1656

Schools
 Royal Agricultural University, Cirencester, Gloucestershire, UK
 Royal College, Colombo, Sri Lanka
 Royal College of Art, London, UK
 Royal Grammar School Worcester, UK
 Royal High School, Edinburgh, Scotland, UK
 Royal Military College, Duntroon, Australian Capital Territory, Australia
 Royal University of Bhutan
 Royal University of Ireland

Sports
 Kansas City Royals, a major league baseball team founded in 1969
 Royal '95, a Surinamese association football club.

Other uses
 Royal (sail), a small sail on square rigged sailing ships
 Royal, a traditional size of paper
 Royal Medal, awarded annually by the Royal Society

See also
 
 Royals (disambiguation)
 Royal Bank (disambiguation)
 Royal Gorge (disambiguation)
 Royal Hospital (disambiguation)
 Royal institute (disambiguation)
 Royal Library (disambiguation)
 Royal stars
 Royal Theatre (disambiguation)
 Royal Valley (disambiguation)
 Theatre Royal (disambiguation)
 Vale Royal (disambiguation)
 Royale (disambiguation)
 Royall (disambiguation)